The Pennsylvania State Capitol Police is a section of the Pennsylvania Department of General Services providing law enforcement, security and parking enforcement services to the State Capitol Complex in Harrisburg, and at state government office buildings in Philadelphia, Pittsburgh, and Scranton, Pennsylvania. Their jurisdiction is primarily state owned buildings and property on the Capitol Complex. The Capitol Police jurisdiction extends to several state owned buildings throughout the city of Harrisburg and local townships.

The Pennsylvania State Capitol Police Force was established in 1895 under Governor Daniel Hartman Hastings, the state's 21st Governor. The enactment authorized the Capitol Police as the first Pennsylvania police agency under Commonwealth jurisdiction and the second oldest state police organization in the United States, after the Texas Rangers.

Accreditation

The Capitol Police was initially accredited on July 9, 2005 through the Pennsylvania Law Enforcement Accreditation Commission (PLEAC) and Pennsylvania Chiefs of Police Association. In 2020, the Pennsylvania Capitol Police received their fifth re-accreditation. In addition to being re-accredited, the Pennsylvania Capitol Police was awarded the Premier Agency Status by the PA Chiefs of Police.

The Capitol Police received International Accreditation on July 28, 2007, through the Commission on Accreditation for Law Enforcement Agencies (CALEA). In 2020, the Capitol Police was awarded their fifth award for being re-accredited. CALEA recognized the Pennsylvania Capitol Police for their professional excellence and demonstrating a commitment to being a highly trained police department.

Equipment

The PSCP has an all-Ford patrol fleet that consists of Police Interceptor Sedans and Police Interceptor Utilitys. The agency's vehicles are both marked and unmarked.

The Department has four K-9 Explosive Units trained in the detection of explosives. All delivery vehicles entering the building of the Capital Complex are searched. Also, the Capitol Police Department has a K-9 Narcotics/Patrol unit trained in the detection of drugs as well as for search and rescue operations.

Units 
 Patrol
 K-9's (Explosive and Narcotics Detection and search and rescue)
 Bike Patrol
 Criminal Investigations
 Criminal Intelligence
 Mobile Field Force
 Special Response Team (S.R.T)
 Active Shooter and Crime Prevention Training
 Risk and Vulnerability Assessments

See also

 List of law enforcement agencies in Pennsylvania
Capitol Police

References

External links
Pennsylvania Capitol Police
F.O.P. Lodge 85

Specialist police departments of Pennsylvania
Government agencies established in 1895
1895 establishments in Pennsylvania
Capitol police
Pennsylvania State Capitol Complex